Bruce Moses Farquhar Sloss (21 January 1889 – 4 January 1917) was an Australian rules footballer who played as a follower with Essendon and South Melbourne in the Victorian Football League (VFL), and with Brighton in the Victorian Football Association (VFA).

Early life
Bruce Sloss, the youngest son of James Davis and Christina Sloss, was born in East Malvern on 21 January 1889.

As he grew up, he was a keen footballer and cricketer, and he taught Bible classes at the Malvern Presbyterian Church – where his name appears on its Roll of Honour. He was handsome, stood tall, and had a wonderful tenor voice.

Essendon 
When just 18, Sloss was invited to train with Essendon. He played his first match in round 2 of the 1907 season against Melbourne. He played one more senior match for Essendon that year, against Geelong, in round 8; and he played his third and last senior game for Essendon in round 2 of the 1908 season.

Brighton 
Having realized that he would not gain regular selection with Essendon, he left Essendon after that second round match and went to the VFA Club, Brighton.

He played for Brighton for the remainder of the 1908 season, the entire 1909 season, and the first half of the 1910 season.

In 1909, he played for the VFA team that was beaten by 19 points by the South Australian Football League (SAFL), 7.8 (50) to 4.7 (31). He was one of the best on the ground for the VFA team.

South Melbourne 
South Melbourne took some time to obtain a VFL clearance permit for him to play with them.

He was not able to play his first match for South Melbourne until the round 10 match of the 1910 season against Richmond.

Playing as a follower, he was tallish for his era and somewhat lightly framed; he was, however, renowned for his speed and agility, and for his high marking ability, and the accuracy of his long kicking.

He played a number of representative games for Victoria, including in the 1914 Sydney Carnival.

In his last VFL match, the 1914 Grand Final against Carlton – which Carlton won 6.9 (45) to an inaccurate South Melbourne's 4.15 (39) – Sloss ran himself into the ground, and nearly won the game off his own boot; and, despite South Melbourne losing, many considered Sloss to be the best player on the ground.

The eminent sporting journalist Jack Worrall – the former Australian Test cricketer and Fitzroy footballer, and the former Carlton coach and incumbent Essendon coach – writing in The Australasian, had this to say of Sloss's performance:

Engineer
Sloss was employed as a maintenance engineer at a jam factory. He invented (and patented) a method for cutting melons into cubes that involved revolving circular wheels (instead of fixed knife blades) which prevented the fruit being reduced to a pulp. An article in The Recorder reported that his invention had "revolutionised the jam-making industry".

Soldier
Sloss enlisted in 1915, and was trained as a machine-gun officer. He was commissioned as a Second Lieutenant on 17 January 1916, and was assigned to the 10th Machine Gun Company, First A.I.F. (the unit in which his oldest brother Roy also served). The Unit arrived in England in July 1916. Whilst the Unit was in camp (on 3 September), Sloss was promoted to Lieutenant.

Soldier and footballer
On Saturday 28 October 1916, an Australian Rules football match was held between two teams of Australian servicemen in aid of the British and French Red Cross at Queen's Club, West Kensington. Sloss was the captain of the (winning) Third Australian Divisional team in the famous match. His team beat the Australian Training Units team 6.16 (52) to 4.12 (36). A news film was taken at the match.

Death and burial
Sloss arrived in France in 1916 and was headquartered behind the front at Armentieres. On 4 January 1917, after returning from the frontlines and talking to a fellow soldier, Sloss was killed instantly when a stray German artillery shell landed at his feet, showering him with white-hot shrapnel. He is buried at the Cité Bonjean Military Cemetery, Armentières, in Northern France.

See also
 List of Victorian Football League players who died in active service
 1916 Pioneer Exhibition Game

Footnotes

References
 Pioneer Exhibition Game Australian Football: in aid of British and French Red Cross Societies: 3rd Australian Division v. Australian Training Units at Queen's Club, West Kensington, on Saturday, October 28th, 1916, at 3pm, Wightman & Co., (London), 1919.
 Main, J. & Allen, D., "Sloss, Bruce", pp. 179–183 in Main, J. & Allen, D., Fallen – The Ultimate Heroes: Footballers Who Never Returned From War, Crown Content, (Melbourne), 2002. 
 Maplestone, M., Flying Higher: History of the Essendon Football Club 1872–1996, Essendon Football Club, (Melbourne), 1996. 
 Ross, J. (ed), 100 Years of Australian Football 1897–1996: The Complete Story of the AFL, All the Big Stories, All the Great Pictures, All the Champions, Every AFL Season Reported, Viking, (Ringwood), 1996. 
 Richardson, N. (2016), The Game of Their Lives, Pan Macmillan Australia: Sydney. 
 Football in England: High Mark by Lieut. Sloss, The Winner, (Wednesday, 10 January 1917), p.4.
 First World War Embarkation Roll: Second Lieutenant Bruce Sloss, collection of the Australian War Memorial.
 First World War Nominal Roll: Lieutenant Bruce Sloss, collection of the Australian War Memorial.
 First World War Service Record: Lieutenant Bruce Sloss, National Archives of Australia.
 Roll of Honour: Lieutenant Bruce Moses Farquhar Sloss, Australian War Memorial .

External links

 Australian Football Biography: Bruce Sloss
 AFL Player Statistics (Round by Round): Essendon Football Club 1907
 AFL Player Statistics (Round by Round): Essendon Football Club 1908
 AFL Player Statistics (Round by Round): South Melbourne Football Club 1910
 AFL Player Statistics (Round by Round): South Melbourne Football Club 1911
 AFL Player Statistics (Round by Round): South Melbourne Football Club 1912
 AFL Player Statistics (Round by Round): South Melbourne Football Club 1913
 AFL Player Statistics (Round by Round): South Melbourne Football Club 1914
 Blueseum: Grand Final, 1914

1889 births
1917 deaths
Australian Rules footballers: place kick exponents
Sydney Swans players
Essendon Football Club players
Participants in "Pioneer Exhibition Game" (London, 28 October 1916)
Brighton Football Club players
Australian Army officers
Australian military personnel killed in World War I
Australian Presbyterians
Australian rules footballers from Melbourne
People from Malvern, Victoria
Engineers from Melbourne
Military personnel from Melbourne